Harris Lake is a lake in Berrien County, in the U.S. state of Michigan.

Harris Lake was named after Benjamin Harris, a pioneer who settled at the lake in 1850.

References

Lakes of Berrien County, Michigan